Taif Sami Mohammed is the Finance Minister and Director General of the Budget Department, Iraq. She has been in the forefront in preventing and deterring budget corruption in Iraq. She was awarded the  International Women of Courage Award in 2022.

References

Recipients of the International Women of Courage Award
Year of birth missing (living people)
Place of birth missing (living people)
Living people
University of Baghdad alumni